The World's First Lady Mayor was a 1900 New Zealand docu-drama film. It is the second-oldest surviving film in New Zealand, the oldest being The Departure of the Second Contingent for the Boer War from earlier the same year.

Elizabeth Yates is re-enacting a speech she gave as mayor in 1893. Yates was the first woman mayor in the British Empire when elected mayor of Onehunga, New Zealand in 1893.

Susanna M. Salter of Argonia, Kansas, is widely regarded as the first woman elected mayor in the world.

References

1900s New Zealand films
1893 in New Zealand
1900 films
1900s documentary films
Black-and-white documentary films
Films set in New Zealand
New Zealand documentary films
New Zealand short films
New Zealand silent films